Fábio Daniel Ferreira Vieira (born 30 May 2000) is a Portuguese professional footballer who plays as an attacking midfielder for  club Arsenal.

He started his career with Porto, where he made 76 competitive appearances and scored ten goals, winning two Primeira Liga and the 2021–22 Taça de Portugal. In July 2022, he signed with Arsenal.

Vieira represented Portugal at youth level. He finished runner-up at the 2021 European Championship with the under-21 team, being voted the tournament's best player.

Club career

Porto
Born in Santa Maria da Feira, Aveiro District, Vieira played nine matches as Porto's juniors won the 2018–19 UEFA Youth League, and scored to open their 3–1 win against Chelsea in the final in Nyon on 29 April. On 24 October 2018, in a group game, he was sent off for two yellow cards in a 2–1 loss at Lokomotiv Moscow.

Vieira made his senior debut with Porto B on 24 February 2019, coming on as a 57th-minute substitute for João Mário in a 1–0 away defeat to Arouca in the LigaPro. Six months and a day later, he scored for the first time with a penalty in a 3–1 away victory over Farense.

Vieira played his first competitive match with the first team on 10 June 2020, featuring 19 minutes in the 1–0 Primeira Liga home defeat of Marítimo. Again from the bench, he scored his first goal in the competition on 5 July to help the hosts beat Belenenses SAD 5–0, and totalled eight appearances at the end of the season for the eventual champions.

On 27 October 2020, in only his second appearance in the UEFA Champions League, Vieira netted in the 2–0 win against Olympiacos in the group stage after starting at the Estádio do Dragão. On 20 March 2022, his 32nd-minute strike decided the local derby at Boavista. He scored his first league brace two weeks later, his side's first and second goals in a 3–0 home win over Santa Clara.

Vieira found more space within the first team during the 2021–22 campaign, especially after impressing in the 2021 UEFA European Under-21 Championship where he was named player of the tournament, providing two hat-tricks of assists against Moreirense and Beleneses SAD and totalling 14 – second-best in the league – and six goals to help his side to a domestic double of the league and Taça de Portugal.

Arsenal
On 17 June 2022, Porto reached an agreement with Premier League club Arsenal for the transfer of Vieira for a fee of €35 million (£29.9 million) plus €5 million (£4.4 million) in add-ons. Four days later, a long-term contract was agreed. Having arrived injured, he made his league debut on 4 September, replacing Albert Sambi Lokonga in the 74th minute of the 3–1 loss at Manchester United. His first start occurred four days later in a 2–1 win over FC Zürich in the group stage of the UEFA Europa League, and he scored his first goal on 18 September to close a 3–0 domestic league victory at Brentford.

International career
Vieira played all five matches as Portugal finished runners-up to Spain at the 2019 UEFA European Under-19 Championship in Armenia. In the group phase against the same team on 17 July, he earned a 1–1 draw with a free kick in Yerevan. He and teammate Félix Correia were named in the Team of the Tournament.

On 14 November 2019, Vieira won his first cap for the under-21 side, being booked in the 0–0 friendly home draw with Slovenia. Five days later, he scored once and provided one assist in a 3–2 victory in Norway in the 2021 UEFA European Championship qualifiers. He was voted best player of the finals in Hungary and Slovenia, featuring in all six games and netting once for the runners-up.

In October 2022, Vieira was named in a preliminary 55-man squad for the 2022 FIFA World Cup in Qatar.

Career statistics

Club

Honours
Porto Youth
UEFA Youth League: 2018–19

Porto
Primeira Liga: 2019–20, 2021–22
Taça de Portugal: 2021–22

Portugal U19
UEFA European Under-19 Championship runner-up: 2019

Portugal U21
UEFA European Under-21 Championship runner-up: 2021

Individual
Primeira Liga Midfielder of the Month: April 2022
SJPF Young Player of the Month: January 2022
UEFA European Under-19 Championship Team of the Tournament: 2019
UEFA European Under-21 Championship Team of the Tournament: 2021
UEFA European Under-21 Championship Player of the Tournament: 2021

References

External links
Arsenal official profile
Premier League profile

2000 births
Living people
Sportspeople from Santa Maria da Feira
Portuguese footballers
Association football midfielders
Primeira Liga players
Liga Portugal 2 players
Padroense F.C. players
FC Porto B players
FC Porto players
Premier League players
Arsenal F.C. players
Portugal youth international footballers
Portugal under-21 international footballers
Portuguese expatriate footballers
Expatriate footballers in England
Portuguese expatriate sportspeople in England